Wilsonia is an unincorporated community on the North Branch Potomac River in Grant County, West Virginia, United States. Wilsonia originated as a railroad stop on the Western Maryland Railroad in northwestern Grant County. It lies off West Virginia Route 90.

References

Unincorporated communities in Grant County, West Virginia
Unincorporated communities in West Virginia